Erromyzon is a genus of fish in the family Gastromyzontidae endemic to China and Vietnam.

Species
There are currently 5 recognized species in this genus:
 Erromyzon compactus Kottelat, 2004
 Erromyzon damingshanensis L. H. Xiu & J. Yang, 2017
 Erromyzon kalotaenia J. Yang, Kottelat, J. X. Yang & X. Y. Chen, 2012
 Erromyzon sinensis (Y. Y. Chen, 1980)
 Erromyzon yangi Neely, Conway & Mayden, 2007

References

Fish of Asia
Gastromyzontidae